Craigmount School was a private school originally for boys, but for most of its history for girls, in Edinburgh. It opened in 1874 and closed in 1966.

History
Craigmount was founded in Edinburgh in 1874 as a school for boys. In 1884, it was re-opened as a boarding school for girls. During the Second World War and the immediate post-war years (from 1939–52), the school was at Scone Palace, Perthshire. At the end of the summer term, 1952, it moved to Minto in the Borders, leasing Minto House. In 1962, Minto House was purchased for £20,000. In 1966, the  school was closed.

Notable alumni

Thomas Maule Guthrie, (died 30 March 1943) was a Scottish Liberal Party politician.
James Fullarton Muirhead (1853–1934), writer of travel guides, longtime associate of the Baedeker publishing house.
Mason Scott, rugby union international for England
William Martin Scott, rugby union international for England
Henry Springmann, rugby union international for England
Archibald Williamson, 1st Baron Forres, Scottish businessman and politician

References

Defunct secondary schools in Edinburgh
Defunct schools in Perth and Kinross
Defunct secondary schools in the Scottish Borders
Educational institutions established in 1874
Educational institutions disestablished in 1966
Defunct private schools in Scotland
Defunct private schools in Edinburgh
Defunct boarding schools in Scotland
1874 establishments in Scotland
1966 disestablishments in Scotland